The Doughboy Island, part of the Tin Kettle Group within the Furneaux Group, is a  unpopulated mainly granite island, located in Bass Strait, lying west of the Flinders and Cape Barren islands, Tasmania, in south-eastern Australia.

The island has been devastated by irresponsible farming practices and fire.

Fauna
Recorded breeding seabird and wader species are little penguin, Pacific gull and sooty oystercatcher.  The metallic skink is present.

See also

 List of islands of Tasmania

References

Furneaux Group
Islands of North East Tasmania
Islands of Bass Strait